Classical Voices was a station on Sirius Satellite Radio channel 86 and DISH Network channel 6086 devoted to vocal classical music. It was replaced in September 2006 by the Metropolitan Opera Radio channel.

See also
 Dish Network Channel Grid
 List of Sirius Satellite Radio stations

External links
 Sirius Satellite Radio Official Website
 Dish Network Official Website

Defunct radio stations in the United States
Radio stations established in 2002
Radio stations disestablished in 2006